Roger Federer was the defending champion and successfully defended his title, defeating Marius Copil in the final, 7–6(7–5), 6–4. 

Roger Federer won his ninth Swiss Indoors, 99th singles title and also reached the final the past 12 times he has played this event. By winning the title, his consecutive winning streak in his hometown tournament was extended to 20 matches.

Seeds

Draw

Finals

Top half

Bottom half

Qualifying

Seeds

Qualifiers

Lucky loser
  Dušan Lajović

Qualifying draw

First qualifier

Second qualifier

Third qualifier

Fourth qualifier

References
 Main draw
 Qualifying draw

Swiss Indoors - Singles